Iris Völkner (born 16 October 1960, in Hamburg) is a German rower.

References 

 
 

1960 births
Living people
Rowers from Hamburg
Rowers at the 1984 Summer Olympics
Olympic bronze medalists for West Germany
Olympic rowers of West Germany
Olympic medalists in rowing
West German female rowers

Medalists at the 1984 Summer Olympics